The Leader of the Opposition in the Tamil Nadu Legislative Assembly is an elected Member of Legislative Assembly who leads the official opposition in the Tamil Nadu Legislative Assembly. The Leader of the Opposition in the Tamil Nadu Legislative Assembly is the chairperson of the largest political party in the legislative assembly that is not in government (provided that said political party has at least 10% of the seats in the legislative assembly).

Since 1952, the Tamil Nadu Legislative Assembly has had 18 leaders of the opposition. The longest-serving leader of the opposition, J. Jayalalithaa from All India Anna Dravida Munnetra Kazhagam became the legislative assembly's first and, to date, only female leader of the opposition. She was the first actress to become the leader of the opposition in the state's legislative assembly in India, while Desiya Murpokku Dravida Kazhagam's founder Vijayakant is the first actor to become the leader of the opposition in the state's legislative assembly in India. The Dravida Munnetra Kazhagam's former president, M. Karunanidhi, has the second-longest tenure, having held the office for 5 years and 259 days, and S. Balakrishnan from the Tamil Maanila Congress (Moopanar) has the third-longest tenure, having held the office for 4 years and 356 days.

The current incumbent has been Edappadi K. Palaniswami of the All India Anna Dravida Munnetra Kazhagam since 11 May 2021.

List
Key
 Resigned
 Died in office
 Returned to office after a previous non-consecutive term
Legend

Statistics
List of leaders of the opposition by length of term

Timeline

List by party

Parties by total duration (in days) of holding Leader of the Opposition's Office

See also
History of Tamil Nadu
Elections in Tamil Nadu
List of governors of Tamil Nadu
Chief Secretariat of Tamil Nadu
Tamil Nadu Legislative Assembly
List of chief ministers of Tamil Nadu
List of current Indian opposition leaders
List of deputy chief ministers of Tamil Nadu
List of speakers of the Tamil Nadu Legislative Assembly
List of leaders of the house in the Tamil Nadu Legislative Assembly

Notes

References

 
 
Tamil Nadu Legislative Assembly
Lists of people from Tamil Nadu
Leaders of the Opposition